SIBIIR is a Norwegian blackened hardcore band from Oslo. The band was formed in 2014, and released their first single in 2015. Since then, SIBIIR has released two critically acclaimed albums on the label Fysisk Format.

History 
The band consists of Jimmy Nymoen (vocals), Tobias Gausemel Backe (guitar), Steffen Grønneberg (guitar), Kent Nordli (bass) and Eivind Kjølstad (drums), and was formed in Oslo in 2014. Their first single Swallow and Trap Them! was premiered exclusively on MetalSucks, who wrote: "This is one of those songs you pretty much have to be a crazy person not to dig". Their self titled debut album SIBIIR was released in 2016, and got great reviews from several music magazines.  Their latest album, Ropes has also gotten great reviews, Metal Injection wrote "If nasty vocals, blackened guitars, and fiercely punk drumming is your jam, then you owe it to yourself to check out SIBIIR"

SIBIIR has also toured around in Europe, and have played at festivals like Roskilde Festival, and Øyafestivalen.  They have been on tour with bands like Kvelertak and Enslaved (band).

Releases

Albums 
 SIBIIR, Fysisk Format, 2016
 Ropes, Fysisk Format, 2019

Singles 
 Swallow and Trap Them!/ These Rats We Deny, Disiplin Media, 2015

References 

Norwegian hard rock musical groups